Peter Vredenburgh (1805–1873) was an associate justice of the New Jersey Supreme Court from 1854 to 1868.

Vredenburgh lived in Freehold Township, New Jersey.

A prominent and successful lawyer of Freehold, Vredenburgh "took an active and leading part in politics, and held positions of trust", serving for fifteen years as Prosecutor of the Pleas, and for a term represented Monmouth county in the Senate of New Jersey. For fourteen years he served as Associate Justice of the Supreme Court of New Jersey.

He is the father of  Peter Vredenburgh Jr., lawyer and Union Army Major in the American Civil War, and William H. Vredenburgh, judge on New Jersey Court of Errors and Appeals 1897–1916.

Camp Vredenburgh, home to 14th New Jersey Volunteer Infantry, during the American Civil War, was named in his honor.

See also
New Jersey Court of Errors and Appeals
Courts of New Jersey
List of justices of the Supreme Court of New Jersey

References 

1805 births
1873 deaths
Justices of the Supreme Court of New Jersey
American people of Dutch descent
Politicians from Monmouth County, New Jersey
Politicians from Somerville, New Jersey
People from Freehold Township, New Jersey
Rutgers University alumni
New Jersey state senators
19th-century American politicians
19th-century American judges